The Council of Würzburg, also called the Synod of Würzburg or Diet of Würzburg, was a simultaneous church council and royal diet held in Würzburg in March 1287.

Background
The council and diet were convoked in February 1287 by Cardinal Giovanni Boccamazza, the legate of Pope Honorius IV in Germany, and King Rudolf I for 9 March 1287. Giovanni had come to Germany at the request of King Rudolf, whose planned trip to Rome to obtain the imperial crown had been delayed. One of the main purposes of the council, therefore, was to secure funding for the coronation among other things. The anticipated financial demands of the legate engendered strong opposition within the German episcopate, led by the archbishop of Cologne, Siegfried II.

Siegfried circulated a document outlining the case against the legate and probably intended for an appeal to Rome. The legate was accused of trying to sever the Kingdom of Germany from the Holy Roman Empire and set up a hereditary king, thus negating the rights of the prince electors, which had been recognized by Innocent III in the decretal  (1202). Rumours of threats to the electors were also recorded in the Annales breves Wormatienses.

Council and statutes
The council opened a week late on 16 March 1287 in the cathedral of Würzburg. It was attended by bishops from the ecclesiastical provinces of Aquileia, Mainz, Cologne, Trier, Salzburg, Bremen, Magdeburg, Besançon and Regensburg.

During the first ordinary session on 18 March, the statutes were promulgated. These were 42 canons mainly dealing with disciplinary matters. Unlike the other main business of the council, these met with no opposition. They were based on the decrees of the Lateran council of 1179 and the council of Lyon of 1274. Canon 7 forbade the holding of two masses in one day. Canon 15 forbade clergy to charge for officiating marriages and funerals. Canon 28 forbade the fortification of church's without the bishop's permission.

During the second session on 26 March, the cardinal announced the taxation of clergy to finance Rudolf's trip to Rome and imperial coronation. It is not clear from the surviving sources how much money the legate demanded. According to some German sources, he asked for a quarter of all income to be paid over four years. Siegfried of Cologne read out a letter of protest. The bishop of Toul, climbed onto the font to rant at the pope's exorbitant exactions he was asked to pay in both France and Germany.

After the second session, the council broke up in disorder. The cardinal's mandate ended with the death of Honorius IV on 3 April. Rudolf gave the legate a safeconduct to protect him from repercussions. By 7 April, Giovanni was in Worms.

In connection with the council, numerous letters of indulgence were issued to recipients throughout the empire, mainly to monasteries, cathedrals and hospitals.

Diet and peace
The royal diet opened a week late, simultaneously with the council. Rudolf I had the assembled princes swear to maintain the public peace (Landfrieden) throughout the empire for a period of three years. Rudolf envisage this peace enforced by judges operated on a regional basis in concert with the princes. The origin of the system of imperial circles, only fully realized in 1500, is usually located in Rudolf's peace plan. Following the diet, he issued a recess in German proclaiming the peace. Because the recess is one of the earliest royal acts drawn up in the vernacular, it gave rise to later traditions that Rudolf made German the legal language of Germany in preference to Latin, but this is not the case.

On 27 March, Rudolf asked the legate on behalf of the diet to excommunicate all rebels who had been under the imperial ban for a year, including Count Guy of Flanders.

Notes

Bibliography

1287 in Europe
History of Würzburg
13th-century Catholic Church councils
Catholic Church councils held in Germany
Imperial Diets (Holy Roman Empire)